The 1460s BC was a decade lasting from January 1, 1469 BC to December 31, 1460 BC.

Events and trends
 c. 1469 BC—In the Battle of Megiddo, Egypt defeats Canaan.

Significant people
 Hatshepsut of Egypt, female Pharaoh of the 18th Dynasty (1473 BC–1458 BC)

References